The American Board of Emergency Medicine is one of 24 medical specialty certification boards recognized by the American Board of Medical Specialties.

ABEM certifies emergency physicians who meet its educational, professional, and examination standards. ABEM certification is sought and earned by emergency physicians on a voluntary basis; ABEM is not a member association.

See also
American Board of Medical Specialties
American Osteopathic Board of Emergency Medicine
Board of Certification in Emergency Medicine

References

External links
 ABEM homepage

Medical associations based in the United States
Emergency medicine organisations
Medical and health organizations based in Michigan